Kari Antero Oswald Kairamo, titled Vuorineuvos (31 December 1932, in  Helsinki in Finland – 11 December 1988, in Espoo, Finland), was a Chairman and CEO of Nokia Corporation and a significant and popular person in the industry, who was also actively involved in Finland's foreign policy.

Biography

Career
Kari Kairamo had a master's degree in engineering (wood processing). Early on in his career, he had leading positions in several international firms in the paper industry. Nokia hired him in 1967, when it was still a major player in the forest industry. In 1977, Kairamo became CEO of Nokia after Björn Westerlund retired. Kairamo's mission was to build Nokia fast into an internationally large multi-industry company, and he led several courageous acquisitions for the company.

The late 1980s was a very special period of time both for the Nokia Corporation and for Finland. The place Finland occupied on the map of Europe was about to change, and cold war and protectionism in the Finnish trade politics was about to break down. Kairamo saw the importance of Nokia, the biggest company in Finland, as a major agent in getting Finland closer to Western Europe, although at the same time he considered the Soviet Union to be an important trade partner and managed to retain close relations with major Soviet politicians and business leaders.

Death
Kari Kairamo committed suicide by hanging himself in his home on 11 December 1988, an act which Nokia at first attempted to hide. He had an endless amount of energy and a stunning work efficiency. Suffering from bipolar disorder is also a commonly suspected reason for his tragic decision. As he was part of the Kihlman family, famous for their artists, some people close to the family suspect he was manic-depressive like many great artists.

References

1932 births
1988 deaths
Businesspeople from Helsinki
Nokia people
Suicides by hanging in Finland
20th-century Finnish businesspeople